Peterna Club de Fútbol is a Spanish football team based in Paterna, in the autonomous community of Valencian Community. Founded in 1934, it plays in Regional Preferente, holding home matches at Estadio Municipal Gerardo Salvador. The club is famous for dedicating many efforts to its school throughout its history.

Season to season

16 seasons in Tercera División

References

External links
Official website 
La Preferente team profile 
Soccerway team profile

Association football clubs established in 1934
1934 establishments in Spain
Football clubs in the Valencian Community
Province of Valencia